Austria was represented by Anita, with the song "Einfach weg", at the 1984 Eurovision Song Contest, which took place on 5 May in Luxembourg City. The song was chosen through a national final organised by broadcaster ORF.

Before Eurovision

National final 
The final was held on 22 March 1984 at the ORF TV Studios in Vienna, hosted by Vera Russwurm. The winning song was chosen by a jury of 250 viewers who voted by telephone.

At Eurovision 
On the night of the final Anita performed thirteenth in the running order, following Yugoslavia and preceding Germany. At the close of voting "Einfach weg" had received 5 points, placing Austria 19th (last) of the 19 entries. The Austrian jury awarded its 12 points to Sweden.

Voting

References 

1984
Countries in the Eurovision Song Contest 1984
Eurovision